National Highway 112 (NH 112) is a National Highway in India entirely within the state of Rajasthan.

Route
 Jaitaran
 Bilara
 Kaparda
 Jodhpur
 Pachpadra
 Balotra
 Tilwara
 Baytu
 Kawas

See also
 List of National Highways in India (by Highway Number)
 List of National Highways in India
 National Highways Development Project

References

External links
  NH network map of India-Source-mapsofindia

112
National highways in India (old numbering)
Barmer, Rajasthan